I, Tonya is a 2017 American biographical sports mockumentary black comedy film directed by Craig Gillespie, and written by Steven Rogers. The plot follows the life and career of American figure skater Tonya Harding (Margot Robbie), with particular focus on her connection to the 1994 attack on her skating rival and Olympic teammate Nancy Kerrigan. Sebastian Stan plays the supporting role of Harding's husband, Jeff Gillooly, and Allison Janney as her mother LaVona Golden. I, Tonya had its world premiere at the 2017 Toronto International Film Festival on September 8, and was released in the United States on December 8.

I, Tonya garnered awards and nominations in a variety of categories following its release, with particular praise for the film itself, Tatiana S. Riegel's editing, and the acting performances of Robbie and Janney. At the 7th AACTA International Awards, the film received three nominations and went on to win Best Actress for Robbie and Best Supporting Actress for Janney. For her work on the film, Riegel won the American Cinema Editors Award for Best Edited Feature Film – Comedy or Musical. Robbie, Janney and Riegel all earned nominations for their work at the 90th Academy Awards. The 71st British Academy Film Awards saw the film garner five nominations, including Best Original Screenplay for Rogers, Best Actress in a Leading Role for Robbie and Best Actress in a Supporting Role for Janney. At the 23rd Critics' Choice Awards, I, Tonya earned five nominations including Best Comedy. Janney won Best Supporting Actress, while Robbie won Best Actress in a Comedy.

Costume designer Jennifer Johnson received a nomination for her work at the 20th Costume Designers Guild Awards. The film gathered three nominations from the 75th Golden Globe Awards, with Janney winning Best Supporting Actress in a Motion Picture. The 33rd Independent Spirit Awards saw I, Tonya nominated in the Best Editing, Best Female Lead and Best Supporting Female categories. Producers Bryan Unkeless, Steven Rogers, Robbie, and Tom Ackerley received a nomination for the Producers Guild of America Award for Best Theatrical Motion Picture. At the 22nd Satellite Awards, I, Tonya was nominated for Best Film, Best Actress for Robbie and Best Supporting Actress for Janney. Both actresses garnered nominations at the 24th Screen Actors Guild Awards. Rogers also received a nomination for the Writers Guild of America Award for Best Original Screenplay.

Awards and nominations

Notes
 Certain award groups do not simply award one winner. They recognize several different recipients and have runners-up. Since this is a specific recognition and is different from losing an award, runner-up mentions are considered wins in this award tally.

 Each date is linked to the article about the awards held that year, wherever possible.

 Tied with Sally Hawkins for The Shape of Water

 Tied with Laurie Metcalf for Lady Bird

References

External links
 

I, Tonya accolades
Lists of accolades by film